The Diamond Queen is a BBC documentary series, presented by Andrew Marr, which looks at the life of Queen Elizabeth II. The series focuses on her accession, her daily routine, how she is seen as a role model, and how she coped in her 60th year as monarch. The programme features archive footage of the Queen, as well as in-depth footage of her major engagements since the beginning of 2010 to late 2011.

Programmes

Critical reception
The Diamond Queen series reached an audience of 7.2 million UK viewers for the first episode and 6.5 and 6.8 million for the next episodes. It achieved an Audience Appreciation Index of 90 out of 100 for each episode; a higher than average rating. The series has since been broadcast around the world.

The documentary was criticised by the campaign group Republic.  Graham Smith, the organisation's chief executive, argued in a letter to the chairman of the BBC Trust, the Lord Patten of Barnes, that the programme breached BBC guidelines on impartiality. Smith wrote in his letter that the series was subject to "distortions, half-truths and fabrications" and commented, "What was presented as a piece of biographical journalism was in fact pro-monarchy polemic". A BBC spokeswoman responded that, "The BBC abides by its requirement to be duly impartial across its output."

References

External links
 

2012 British television series debuts
2012 British television series endings
2010s British documentary television series
BBC high definition shows
BBC television documentaries
Cultural depictions of Elizabeth II
2010s British television miniseries
Diamond Jubilee of Elizabeth II
English-language television shows